Gigbeth is a music festival and conference held in Digbeth, Birmingham, England. First launched in March 2006 and the creation of Birmingham-based producer, promoter and performer Andy Bucknall it is held annually on the first weekend in November. The festival has stages at different venues in the area including The Custard Factory and Digbeth Institute. The event is organised by Clare Edwards, winner of the 2008 Young Musical Entrepreneur of the Year. Gigbeth aims to support local musicians and to boost Birmingham's profile as a centre for music.

Gigbeth 2006 
Dirty Pretty Things
The Raconteurs
Scott Matthews 
The Twang 
Nizlopi
Soweto Kinch
Orchestra of the Swan
DCS Bhangra  
Shady Bard
Basil Gabbidon
Musical Youth

Gigbeth 2007 
Nizlopi

Mr Hudson & The Library
Musical Youth
Achanak
Beardyman
Soweto Kinch
Orchestra of the Swan

Gigbeth 2008 
The Sugarhill Gang
D:Ream
Stanton Warriors
Miles and Erica Hunt (The Wonder Stuff)
Oliver $
Guillemots

References

Music festivals in the West Midlands (county)
Festivals in Birmingham, West Midlands
2006 establishments in England
Recurring events established in 2006